Hawk of the Nile is a 1950 Italian adventure film directed by Giacomo Gentilomo and starring Enzo Fiermonte and Silvana Pampanini.

Plot  
In the first half of the nineteenth century the young Leila left Paris, where she was educated, to go to Cairo to collect the inheritance of her late grandfather, a rich Egyptian pasha. Cousin Ibrahim, who administers the land properties in a dishonest manner with the complicity of his trusted Yusuf, gives the banker Micropulos the research rights in sapphire deposits located in the territory of the Beni Amer Bedouins, making them and Leila believe that they are drilling artesian wells, thus obtaining the approval of Rachid, the young sheikh of the Beni Amer. He, who went to Cairo to renew the pact that allows his people to live on the lands granted them, meets Leila and falls in love with her. Releases land administration to Ibrahim and Yusuf; these, after having commanded the delivery of the weapons, provoke the Beni Amer with the intent to drive them from their land and set them against Rachid. He, informed of the betrayal, goes to the place but is attacked by his people, believed to be the author of the general malaise. In an attempt to capture, he falls into a cliff and is believed dead. Some time later, Leila goes to the Bedouins to ascertain the situation, but a gang led by Ibrahim tries to kill her. A mysterious man, with a covered face, who calls himself Lo Sparrowhawk, runs to save her. Ibrahim, fearing to be discovered, joins Leila in the fortress where he takes refuge, forcing her to marry him in order to inherit his possessions and prevent her from accusing him of the attempted murder. Pretending to be mentally ill following the accident, Rachid is led by Yusuf to the location where the wedding is about to take place, exposed as a mockery. But just before the fateful yes, he reveals himself, he saves Leila and after a dramatic duel he kills Yusuf and Ibrahim. The two young people, finally reunited, can start a life of happiness together.

Cast 
 Silvana Pampanini as Leila
 Enzo Fiermonte as  Rachid 
 Vittorio Gassman as  Yusuf 
 Folco Lulli as  Ibrahim 
 Saro Urzì as  Sahid
 Virginia Balestrieri as  Selma 
 Jone Morino as  Madame Corinne
 Enzo Biliotti as  Micropulos
 Oreste Fares as Mohammed
 Elvy Lissiak as  Selika 
 Ughetto Bertucci

References

External links

1950 adventure films
1950 films
Italian adventure films
Films directed by Giacomo Gentilomo
Films scored by Alessandro Cicognini
Italian black-and-white films
1950s Italian films